Damon diadema is a species of amblypygid, sometimes known as the tailless whip scorpion or Giant  Amblypygid. It is found in Central Africa, Kenya, and Tanzania where it lives in caves, crevices and under fallen logs. It is known as a tailless whipscorpion because of the long whip-legs that are the majority of its body width.

References 

Amblypygi
Arthropods of Africa
Scorpions described in 1876